Stammheim may refer to:
 Stammheim (film), a 1986 West German film directed by Reinhard Hauff
 Stammheim, Cologne, a municipal part of the city of Cologne, Germany
 Stuttgart-Stammheim, a municipal part of the city of Stuttgart, Germany
 Stammheim Prison, a high security prison north of Stuttgart, Germany
 Stammheim, Florstadt, a district of Florstadt, Germany
 Stammheim, Calw, a district of Calw, Germany
 The municipality of Stammheim, Zurich in the canton of Zurich, Switzerland
 The villages of Oberstammheim and Unterstammheim which form Stammheim 
 Stammheim railway station, shared between Oberstammheim and Unterstammheim